Cissa may refer to :

 Places and jurisdictions 
 Cissa, Roman name of present Caska on the island of Pag, Croatia
 Cissa (titular see), a former Catholic diocese with see there, now a Latin titular see
 Cissa, alternate name of ancient Cressa (Thrace)
 Cissa, alternate name of ancient Tarraco
 Battle of Cissa, 218 BC, in the Second Punic War
 Cissa, Burkina Faso, a village in Burkina Faso

 Persons
 Cissa of Crowland, 8th-century saint
 Cissa of Sussex, a (possibly mythological) king of the South Saxons in the 6th century
 Cissa (West Saxon), possibly viceroy of king Centwine of Wessex 

 Other
 Cissa (bird), a genus of magpies